Nevado de Longaví is a volcano in the Andes of central Chile. It features a summit crater and several parasitic vents. The volcano is constructed principally from lava flows. Two collapses of the edifice have carved collapse scars into the volcano, one on the eastern slope known as Lomas Limpias and another on the southwestern slope known as Los Bueye. The volcano features a glacier and the Achibueno and Blanco rivers originate on the mountain.

The oldest volcanic activity occurred one million years ago. After a first phase characterized by the production of basaltic andesite, the bulk of the edifice was constructed by andesitic lava flows. The volcanic rock that makes up Nevado de Longaví features an unusual magma chemistry that resembles adakite (having geochemical characteristics of magma thought to have formed by partial melting of altered basalt that is subducted below volcanic arcs). It may be the consequence of the magma being unusually water-rich, which may occur because the Mocha fracture zone subducts beneath the volcano.

A lava flow was then erupted over the pumice. The last eruption occurred about 5,700 years ago and formed a lava dome. The volcano has no historic eruptions but fumarolic activity is ongoing. Nevado de Longaví is monitored by the National Geology and Mining Service of Chile.

Geography 

Nevado de Longaví lies in the Longaví commune of Linares Province, Maule Region.

Regional 

Nevado de Longaví lies in the Andean Mountain Range's Southern Volcanic Zone, which extends between 33 and 46 degrees southern latitude. It is one among 60 volcanoes in Chile and Argentina that lie within the Southern Volcanic Zone. Among the largest volcanic eruptions in this area were the 1932 Quizapu and the 1991 Cerro Hudson eruptions. Nevado de Longaví is usually put into the "Transitional Southern Volcanic Zone", one of the four segments which the Southern Volcanic Zone is subdivided into; they are characterized by different thicknesses of the crust that the volcanoes are constructed on and by differences in the volcanic rocks. Farther east lie the Tatara-San Pedro and Laguna del Maule volcanoes.

Geology 

The Southern Volcanic Zone is one among several volcanic belts in the Andean Volcanic Belt. Areas without volcanic activity separate it from the Central Volcanic Zone in the north and the Austral Volcanic Zone in the south. These gaps appear to coincide where the Juan Fernández Ridge and the Chile Rise, respectively, subduct in the Peru–Chile Trench. In the volcanic gaps, the subducting slab seems to be attached to the overriding plate without an asthenosphere in between, suppressing the production of magma.
 
There is a strong northsouth gradient among volcanoes of the Southern Volcanic Zone. The northernmost volcanoes are the highest and lie on thicker crust which causes their magmas to have a stronger crustal contribution. The output of the northernmost volcanoes is dominated by andesitic and more evolved magmas and they have the highest quantity of incompatible elements in their magmas. Southern volcanoes are lower, tend to erupt mafic magmas and are located west of the continental divide.

Volcanism in areas of subduction is caused by the release of slab fluids from the subducting slab into the abovelying asthenospheric mantle. The injection of such fluids triggers fluxing and the formation of magmas. Conversely, the descending slab itself is usually not considered a major contributor to magma genesis. Such exceptional magmas are often referred to as adakites, but magmas with such a chemistry can also originate by other processes.

Local 
Nevado de Longaví lies within a small mountain chain. The volcano has a summit crater and many adventive craters on its slopes. The summit crater is heavily degraded by erosion. Lava flows extend radially away from the summit crater and form the bulk of the volcano. The adventive craters are also associated with lava flows. Lahar deposits are found on the eastern slopes.

Scarps on the eastsoutheast flanks resulted from sector collapses of the volcano. The collapse scar was later filled with products from explosive eruptions. Another collapse occurred on the southsouthwestern flank, forming the Los Bueyes collapse and terrace deposits.

Nevado de Longaví is a relatively small volcano.

The basement beneath the volcano is formed by the volcaniclastic Cura-Mallín Formation of Eocene–Miocene age, Miocene plutons and the lavic-breccia Pliocene-Pleistocene Cola de Zorro formation. This last formation was identified as forming a deeply eroded volcano in the Cordón de Villalobos south of Nevado de Longaví. The emplacement of this formation was facilitated by a decrease in the compressional stress that had affected the region prior to the Pliocene.

Some isolated monogenetic volcanic centres can be found southeast of Nevado de Longaví. Aside from Villalobos, this includes Resago and Loma Blanca. The first and the last are of Pleistocene age, based on their preservation. Resago is post-glacial. The last two centres appear to be related to a geological lineament that flanks the eastern slopes of Nevado de Longaví.

Previous glaciation is also supported by the presence of glacial striations on lava flows and of lahar deposits. The Rio Blanco originates on the southeastern slope of Nevado de Longaví, within the collapse scar. It turns south and west around the volcano in a fishhook pattern. The Estero Martinez and Quebrada Los Bueyes rivers also originate on Nevado de Longaví, on the western and southern flank respectively. They are both tributaries of the Rio Blanco. The Achibueno River also originates on the eastern flank of Nevado de Longaví in a lake of the same name. It flows first northeastward and then turns around the volcano.

Composition 

Nevado de Longaví has chiefly erupted andesite, which forms about 80% of the volcano. Smaller amounts of basalt and dacite were also erupted by the volcano, the former in the early stages of activity and as basaltic andesite inclusions, the latter during the Holocene.

Early stage rocks contain phenocrysts of clinopyroxene, olivine and plagioclase. Mainstage rocks in addition contain amphibole and orthopyroxene. In the Holocene rocks, apatite, iron and titanium oxides and sulfides have been found. Aside from minerals, gabbro and mafic rocks form enclaves. Granite xenoliths are also found. Unlike these granites, the gabbros appear to be cumulates considering their chemical similarity to Nevado de Longaví rocks.

The chemistry of Nevado de Longaví's magmas is unusual among the volcanoes of the South Volcanic Zone. For example, the potassium content is unusually low. Likewise, incompatible elements are underrepresented. Modal amphibole is much more prevalent. Nevado de Longaví's magmas have been referred to as adakitic, the only magmas of such chemistry in the Southern Volcanic Zone, but this classification has been contested. Fractional crystallization of amphibole has been invoked to explain some of the compositional patterns.

On the basis of their rubidium content, Nevado de Longaví's magmas have been classified in two groups. The rubidium-rich group resembles that of other volcanoes in the Southern Volcanic Zone; the rubidium-poor group conversely is the "unusual" one. The differences appear to reflect both different parental magmas and different magma evolution. There is a temporal pattern of the magmas becoming more rubidium-poor over time.

The unusual chemical patterns appear to reflect that the magmas erupted from Nevado de Longaví were extremely rich in water. Such a pattern has also been noted at Mocho-Choshuenco and Calbuco. All these volcanoes are located above the points where fracture zones intersect the Peru–Chile Trench, and it has been proposed that these fracture zones channel water into the mantle. In the case of Nevado de Longaví, the Mocha fracture zone is subducting beneath the volcano.

Eruptive history 

Early stage basaltic andesite lava flows crop out on the northern and southwestern slopes of Nevado de Longaví. These volcanic rocks are up to one million years old.

During the main growth stage, volcanic activity was approximately constant considering the homogeneous structure of the lava flows. Temporary periods of dormancy however occurred, causing the formation of erosion valleys on the northern slope that were then filled by younger lava flows. These younger lava flows were themselves subject to glaciation.

Holocene 

The last activity occurred during the Holocene, and included explosive activity. It was centered in the eastern collapse scar and on the summit region.

6,835 ± 65  or 7,500 years before present, a large explosive eruption occurred. It is also known as the Rio Blanco fall deposit. In the eastern collapse scar, the pumice was later buried by an andesitic lava flow, which is undated and carries the name Castillo Andesite.

The last eruption formed a lava dome within the collapse scar and the summit area. This eruption occurred about 5,700 years ago.

The volcano together with Lomas Blancas has been prospected for the potential of obtaining geothermal energy; estimated capacities are 248 megawatts.

Hazards 

The volcano is ranked 22 on Chile's national volcano hazard scale. The towns closest to the volcano are Cerro Los Castillos, La Balsa, La Orilla, Las Camelias and Rincón Valdés; renewed eruptions could result in debris flows, eruption columns, lava flows and pyroclastic flows on the volcano and surrounding valleys. The Mendoza Province in Argentina could also be potentially affected by activity at Nevado de Longaví.

The first recorded ascent occurred in 1965 by S. Kunstmann and W. Foerster, but evidence reported during that ascent implies that humans had reached the mountain earlier. Otherwise, Nevado de Longaví is one of the important tourist attractions of the commune.

References

Bibliography

Further reading 
 
  (in Spanish; also includes volcanoes of Argentina, Bolivia, and Peru)

External links
 Google map of Nevado de Longaví

Volcanoes of Maule Region
Longavi
Longavi
Pleistocene stratovolcanoes
Holocene stratovolcanoes